Mallosia heydeni is a species of beetle in the family Cerambycidae. It was described by Ludwig Ganglbauer in 1888. It is endemic to Turkey.

Mallosia heydeni measure  in length.

References

Saperdini
Beetles of Asia
Endemic fauna of Turkey
Beetles described in 1888